Pratap Singh was an Indian politician (Independent) and a member of the Rajasthan Legislative Assembly representing the Sujangarh Vidhan Sabha constituency of Rajasthan.

Family life
Pratap Singh was born in a village of Aligarh district in Uttar Pradesh. His father's name is Munshiram who was a farmer and freedom fighter influenced by Baba Prabhati. His mother's name is Harpyari was a homemaker.

References 

Living people
Bharatiya Janata Party politicians from Rajasthan
Rajasthan MLAs 2013–2018
1948 births
Rajasthan MLAs 2018–2023